Kindred Spirit(s) may refer to:

Arts
 Kindred Spirits (film), a 1984 Australian film
 Kindred Spirits, a 2019 film by Lucky McKee
 Kindred Spirits (painting), a painting by Asher Brown Durand, a member of the Hudson River School of painters
 Kindred Spirits (sculpture), a large stainless steel outdoor sculpture in Bailick Park in Midleton, County Cork, Ireland

Music
 Kindred Spirit (band), a duo consisting of Debbi Peterson and Siobhan Maher
 Kindred Spirits (music), a London children's choir
 Kindred Spirits, a 2012 album by Clan of Xymox
 Kindred Spirits, a 2020 album by Larkin Poe
 Kindred Spirit, a stolen album by Lisa Kindred, 1966
 Kindred Spirits (Waylander album), 2012
 Kindred Spirits (Zoe Rahman album), 2012
 "Kindred Spirits", a song on Liquid Tension Experiment by Liquid Tension Experiment, 1998
 Kindred Spirits: A Tribute to the Songs of Johnny Cash, 2002

Literature
 Kindred Spirits (novel), a fantasy novel set in the Dragonlance fictional universe
 Kindred Spirits on the Roof, an adult yuri visual novel developed by Liar-soft

Television
 A Kindred Spirit, a television drama series that was broadcast on TVB Jade in Hong Kong
 "Kindred Spirits", a season two episode of the TV series Danny Phantom
 Kindred Spirits (TV series), an American paranormal television and documentary reality series

Other
 , a cultivar of the Quercus × warei hybrid oak tree